David Vivian Day (born 11 August 1936) is a retired British theologian, school teacher, academic, and Anglican priest. From 1992 to 1999, he was Principal of St John's College, Durham.

Early life and education
Day was born on 11 August 1936 to Frederick Vivian Day and Enid Blodwen (née Evans). He was educated at Tottenham Grammar School, a state grammar school in north London. He studied classics at Queen Mary College, University of London, and graduated with a Bachelor of Arts (BA) degree in 1957.

Day continued his university studies in later life. He studied education at the University of Nottingham while he was a teacher in the city, and graduated with a Master of Education (MEd) degree in 1973. He later studied theology at Nottingham, graduating with a Master of Theology (MTh) degree in 1977.

Career
Day's early career was spent as a school teacher. From 1958 to 1964, he was a classics master at Southgate County School, the a state grammar school in the London Borough of Enfield. Then, from 1964 to 1966, he was Head of Religious Education at Southgate. He moved to Bilborough School, then a grammar school in Bilborough, Nottingham, and was its Head of Religious Education between 1966 and 1973.

Day then moved into academia. From 1973 to 1979, he was a senior lecturer in theology at Bishop Lonsdale College, an Anglican teacher training college in Derby. In 1979, he moved to the University of Durham. He was a senior lecturer in education between 1979 and 1997, and was Principal of St John's College, Durham between 1992 and 1999. As head of St John's College, he was also part of the leadership of Cranmer Hall, Durham, an Anglican theological college that trains people for ordained ministry.

Having retired from academia, Day felt the call to ordination. He was ordained in the Church of England as a deacon in 1999 and as a priest in 2000. From 1999 to 2007, he was a non-stipendiary minister at St Nicholas' Church, Durham. Since 2007, he has held Permission to Officiate in the Diocese of Durham, and continues to preach at St Nicholas' .

Personal life
In 1959, Day married Lorna Rosemary Taylor. Together they have three children; one daughter and two sons.

Honours
On 31 March 2016, Day was awarded the Lanfranc Award for Education and Scholarship by Justin Welby, the Archbishop of Canterbury, during a ceremony at Lambeth Palace.

Selected works

References

 

 
 
 

1936 births
Living people
British theologians
Schoolteachers from London
21st-century English Anglican priests
Church of England priests
Academics of Durham University
People educated at Tottenham Grammar School
Alumni of Queen Mary University of London
Alumni of the University of Nottingham
Principals of St John's College, Durham